The women's individual pursuit at the 2012 Dutch National Track Championships in Apeldoorn took place at Omnisport Apeldoorn on December 28, 2012. 8 athletes participated in the contest.

Preview
The title holder, Ellen van Dijk and the main favourite to win the gold did not participate at the 2012 Dutch National Track Championships. The other favourites were the numbers two and three of 2011: Kirsten Wild and Amy Pieters.

Competition format
The tournament started with a qualifying round. The two fastest qualifiers advanced to the gold medal final. The numbers three and four competed against each other for the bronze medal.

Results

Qualification
The qualification round started at 17:05.

Finals
The finals started at 19:30.
Bronze medal match

Gold medal match

Final results

Results from nkbaanwielrennen.nl.

References

2012 Dutch National track cycling championships
Track cycling